Beth McCann (born February 10, 1949) is an American politician who serves as the current Denver District Attorney, the first woman to hold the office.  A Democrat, McCann beat her opponent, independent Helen Morgan, winning 74% of the vote in the November, 2016 general election. Before serving as Denver's DA, McCann served from 2008 to 2017 as a Colorado State Representative, representing House District 8, which encompasses portions of central Denver, Colorado.

Legislative career

2008 election
Beth McCann defeated Matt Bergles and Cindy Lowery in the contested Democratic primary in August, taking 49 percent of votes cast. McCann faced no opposition in the November 2008 general election. Her candidacy was endorsed by the Denver Post.

2009 legislative session
For the 2009 legislative session, McCann was named to seats on the House Appropriations Committee, the House State, Veterans, and Military Affairs Committee, and was tapped to be vice-chair of the House Judiciary Committee. McCann sponsored legislation to limit the number of dogs owned by commercial dog breeders to 25 and to require annual veterinary exams for breeding dogs.

2012 election
In the 2012 General Election, Representative McCann faced Republican challenger Alan Johnson.  McCann was elected by a wide margin of 83% to 13%.

References

External links
 State Representative campaign website
 District Attorney campaign website

1949 births
20th-century American women lawyers
American Presbyterians
District attorneys in Colorado
Georgetown University Law Center alumni
Living people
Democratic Party members of the Colorado House of Representatives
People from Radford, Virginia
Politicians from Denver
Wittenberg University alumni
Women state legislators in Colorado
21st-century American politicians
21st-century American women politicians
20th-century American lawyers
21st-century American women lawyers
21st-century American lawyers